Jack Stephens (31 August 1913 – 2 September 1967) was an Australian cricketer. He played three first-class cricket matches for Victoria between 1932 and 1938.

See also
 List of Victoria first-class cricketers

References

External links
 

1913 births
1967 deaths
Australian cricketers
Victoria cricketers